Yeshaira Robles is an American IFBB Pro fitness and figure competitor (bikini category) and fitness model of Puerto Rican extraction. She won the 2nd place in 2013 Bikini Olympia.

Starting at local NPC events, Robles won her IFBB Pro card after winning the 2011 NPC Team Universe Bikini competition.

References

External links
Yeshaira Robles on Instagram
Yeshaira Robles on Twitter
Yeshaira Robles MHP Strong Profile

1982 births
Living people
American sportspeople of Puerto Rican descent
Sportspeople from the Bronx
Fitness and figure competitors
American sportswomen